The 3rd Air Reconnaissance Regiment (Serbo-Croatian: 3. puk VOJIN / 3. пук ВОЈИН) was an air reconnaissance and guidance regiment established in 1968 and reestablished as part of the SFR Yugoslav Air Force.

History
The 3rd Air Reconnaissance Regiment was established on June 3, 1968, from 68th Air Reconnaissance Battalion with command at Skoplje. It was disbanded by order from September 14, 1972, and in 1973 of him was formed 31st Air Reconnaissance Battalion.

The regiment was reestablished by order from February 28, 1986, from 31st Air Reconnaissance Battalion and other smaller units with command at Niš. It was disbanded in June 1992 and its units have become part of 126th Air Reconnaissance Brigade.

Assignments
13th Air Defense Division (1968–1973)
3rd Corps of Air Force and Air Defense (1986–1992)

Commanding officers
 Gojko Petrović
 Milenko Pejakov
 Slavoljub Drenjanin
 Veselin Savić.

References

Regiments of Yugoslav Air Force
Military units and formations established in 1968
Military units and formations disestablished in 1992